The Ambassador of Ireland to Spain is the head of the Embassy of Ireland, Madrid, and the official representative of the Government of Ireland to the Government of Spain. The official title is Ambassador of Ireland to the Kingdom of Spain.

The incumbent Ambassador is Frank Smyth who was appointed in 2021.

History
Leopold H. Kerney was the first Envoy Extraordinary and Minister Plenipotentiary and was appointed in September 1935. Kerney presented his credentials to the President of the Spanish Republic, Niceto Alcalá Zamora. The legation of the Irish Free State in Madrid was closed temporarily because of the Spanish Civil War. Kerney sought refuge in St Jean de Luz, on the French border with Spain.

In October 1950, the first Ambassador of Ireland was appointed following Ireland's departure from the Commonwealth.

List of representatives

See also
 Ireland–Spain relations

References 

 
Spain
Ireland